Anderson School of Management may refer to:

UCLA Anderson School of Management, University of California, Los Angeles
Anderson School of Management (University of New Mexico)
A. Gary Anderson Graduate School of Management, University of California, Riverside